Dorothy Carrington Thompson CBE (born November 1960) is a British businesswoman; until 2017 she was CEO of Drax Group, a FTSE 250 Index electrical power generation company, and is now non-executive chairman of Tullow Oil, and a director of Eaton Corporation plc.

Early life
Dorothy Carrington Thompson was born in November 1960. She received a BSc (1983) and MSc in Economics from the London School of Economics.

Career
She was CEO of Drax Group from September 2005 to December 2017. Prior to joining Drax, she was assistant group treasurer for Powergen plc, and before that, head of European business at InterGen NV.

In August 2014, she was appointed a non-executive director of the Bank of England.

Honours
In the 2014 Birthday Honours, she was made a Commander of the Order of the British Empire.

References

1960 births
Living people
Alumni of the London School of Economics
British chief executives in the energy industry
British corporate directors
Commanders of the Order of the British Empire
Women corporate directors